Mount Lebanon Baptist Church is a historic church on Louisiana Highway 154, about  west of intersection with Louisiana Highway 517, in Bienville Parish.  It was built in 1857 in a Greek Revival style and was added to the National Register in 1980.

It is a pedimented with pilasters at its corners.  It is framed by hewn timbers.  It was deemed significant as "a good representative example of the simple frame Greek Revival country churches which were built in many parts of the country during the 1840s and 1850s.  Although there have been modifications, the original building is still distinguishable. The modifications are typical of their own period and have acquired architectural value in their own right."

References

See also
National Register of Historic Places listings in Bienville Parish, Louisiana

Baptist churches in Louisiana
Churches on the National Register of Historic Places in Louisiana
Greek Revival church buildings in Louisiana
Churches completed in 1857
Buildings and structures in Bienville Parish, Louisiana
National Register of Historic Places in Bienville Parish, Louisiana
1857 establishments in Louisiana